Shirley's World is a television series aired first by ABC during the 1971–72 television season.  The sitcom was co-produced by the British ITC Entertainment and American producer Sheldon Leonard, with English producer-director Ray Austin; it starred Shirley MacLaine as a photojournalist and John Gregson as her editor at World Illustrated magazine.

Immediately after the ABC broadcasts ended, the seventeen-episode series was aired in its entirety on ITV in the United Kingdom.

Cast and characters
Shirley MacLaine as Shirley Logan
John Gregson as Dennis Croft

Episode list
Filmed on location and at Pinewood Studios England

Production # is the order of the Network DVD.

References

External links 
Comedy Guide – Shirley's World at bbc.co.uk

 UK DVD release

ITV sitcoms
Television series by ITC Entertainment
1970s American sitcoms
1971 American television series debuts
1972 American television series endings
American Broadcasting Company original programming
Television series about journalism
Television series produced at Pinewood Studios
English-language television shows